Melechinnar is a small village in Idukki district of Kerala, India and is situated on the banks of a small river named Chinnar. Most of the inhabitants make their living from agriculture.

Melechinnar is also known as Bethel. People migrated from Pala, Kottayam and other parts of Kerala to this region about 50 years ago. Cardamom, pepper, rubber, cacao and coffee are cultivated. Earlier, some small rice cultivation was there but which is less nowadays. Most of the houses have one or two cow and goats.

Education 

The children go to St.Jacobs UP School Bethel for studying up to 7th standard. After that they have to go to Thoprankudy or Erattayar for higher studies. Financially sound people send children to towns such as Kottayam and Pala for studying where they stay in hostels.

Location 

Melechinnar is located 17 km from Kattappana, 13 km from Nedumkandam and 5 km from Thopramkudy. Road conditions improved as Madura - Theni National highway passes through Chinnar. After the construction of the road, Adimaly is connected to Kattappana through Perinjamkutty, Melechinnar, and Erattayar. The road provides the least travel time compared to other roads. Melechinnar is a junction where roads to Kattappana, Thopramkudy, Nedumkandam and Adimaly meet together. Jeep services were the only means of transportation in the early days. But, now other transportation facilities are available. Both state-owned and privately operated buses provides services.

People are politically aware but different political parties work together. People live in religious harmony.

References

Villages in Idukki district